Marco Matias is the name of:

Marco Matias (footballer) (born 1989), Portuguese footballer
Marco Matias (musician) (born 1975), Portuguese-German musician
Marco Matías (politician) (born 1956), Portuguese politician